18th June Road is one of the busiest streets in Panaji, Goa, India.  It is located in the heart of the city, and is a major shopping destination for the tourist folks.  Major businesses and restaurants line the street.  The street is named after the day in 1946 on which Ram Manohar Lohia had called a meeting to put an end to the Portuguese rule in India.

History

References 

Geography of Panaji
Streets in India